Kim Hyang-mi (born 10 February 1995) is a North Korean ice hockey player. She competed in the 2018 Winter Olympics.

References

1995 births
Living people
Ice hockey players at the 2018 Winter Olympics
North Korean women's ice hockey forwards
Olympic ice hockey players of North Korea
Winter Olympics competitors for Korea